Clubiona robusta or the stout sac spider is a common spider found in Australia. Females are often found living in a silken brooding chamber, under bark of eucalyptus trees. They are small sized spiders. Body length 13 mm for females, 10 mm for males.

References

Clubionidae
Spiders of Australia
Spiders described in 1873